Dubai is a media hub for the Middle East region and is home to many television and radio channels.

Dubai Television 
There are a few terrestrial television channels but most people choose from the hundreds of regional channels on offer via satellite or cable.

Pay or subscription television in Dubai is available on cable via E-Vision (a division of Etisalat) or via satellite directly from the providers; OSN (Orbit Showtime Network), Star TV and ART. OSN provides a wide selection of English (primarily US, but also UK, Canadian, New Zealand and Australian) programming, subtitled in Arabic. Leading English shows and movies are primarily shown first and exclusively on OSN. Star TV also has some first-run programmes.

The main free to air English television channels are Dubai One, MBC 4, MBC Action, MBC 2, Physique TV and City 7 TV. Most shows are broadcast in English, with Arabic subtitles, with the exception of City 7 that does not subtitle their programming. Dubai One, MBC 4 and MBC Action show mostly well known US, and some UK series but will generally be six months or more behind the pay or subscription channels.

The main Free to air Hindi television Channel is Imagine Movies, it is the first Free to Air Hindi Channel from MENA region. The Frequency is also available in Du -91, Elife - 863, OSN, Oreedoo in Qatar.

Abu Dhabi TV, Arabic and in particular local series.
Dubai TV, a channel by the Dubai Media Incorporated (DMI). Arabic local and regional programming.
Dubai One, an English language general entertainment channel, available over the Middle East and North Africa.
 Physique TV, Physique TV is the first and only 24-hour HD television channel in English & Arabic dedicated to fitness, healthy living, nutrition and action sport.
 City 7 TV, an independent Dubai based, free-to-air, 100% English-language channel. Providing locally produced English News, Business and lifestyle programmes combined with International lifestyle, drama and comedy programmes. Available via satellite in the Middle East and North Africa.

Dubai Radio 
Dubai is well served by terrestrial radio (AM & FM) with a huge variety of stations broadcasting in the languages commonly spoken in the city; Arabic, English, Russian, German, French, Japanese, Italian, Hindi, Urdu, Tamil, Malayalam, Chinese, Thai, Vietnamese, Korean, Dutch, Spanish and Filipino. The FM band is particularly crowded, with a new station every 2 or 3 MHz apart, some from neighbouring Emirates and countries in the Persian Gulf region.

General standards have improved greatly in the past few years and many stations are now at par with leading stations in major metropolitan cities in the world. However, the media in Dubai and the UAE is still heavily government regulated. Most stations, even those privately owned, are often still government controlled. In particular, all radio stations must cease normal broadcasting in the event of the death of a Sheikh or close relative of a Sheikh. This normally happens for a period of 3 days to a week, or more, depending on the standing of the deceased.

Dubai radio is the essential guide to surviving Dubai's hectic traffic with most stations placing importance on frequent traffic updates during the day, mostly from listeners.

Arabic Radio
Dubai Holy Quran 91.4 FM - Al Oula Radio Network
Abu Dhabi Radio (AM/FM) (راديو آبوظبي) - Abu Dhabi Media
Dubai 93.0 FM (راديو دبي) - Dubai Media Inc
Al Rabia 107.8 FM (الرابعة) - Channel 4 Radio Network
Al Oula 107.7 FM (الآولى) - Al Oula Radio Network
Al Emarat FM (الإمارات) - Abu Dhabi Media
Al Khaleejia 100.9FM (الخليجية 100.9) - Arab Media Group
Al Rabia 107.8 FM (راديو الرابعة) - Ajman Independent Studios LLC
Mazaji 94.6FM (مزاجي)
Fujairah 92.6 FM (الفجيرة)
Sharjah Radio 94.4 (راديو الشارقة) - Sharjah Broadcasting Authority
Noor Dubai 93.9FM (نور دبي) - Dubai Media Inc
UAQ FM 95.6 (راديو آم القوين) - UAQ Broadcasting Network
Radio Sawa FM (Dubai 90.5 - Abu Dhabi 98.7) (راديو سوا) - Middle East Broadcasting Networks
Star 92.4/99.9FM (ستار) - Abu Dhabi Media
Al Aan FM (راديو الآن)
Al Quran Al Kareem 84.6 (القرآن الكريم) - UAQ Broadcasting Network
Sharjah Quran Radio 102.7 (راديو الشارقة للقرآن) - Sharjah Broadcasting Authority

English radio
Virgin Radio Dubai - Top 40; 104.4 FM - Arab Media Group
Dubai 92 - Adult Contemporary; 92.0 FM - Arab Media Group
Luv Radio 107.1 : 90's Music - Fun Asia Network & UAQ Broadcasting Network
Beat Radio 97.8 - Dance/House/deephouse/electronic; 97.8 FM (Dubai) - Fun Asia Network & UAQ Broadcasting Network
Radio 1 - Top 40/Dance/R&B; 104.1 FM (Dubai), 100.5 FM - Abu Dhabi Media
Radio 2 - Classic Hits; 99.3 FM (Dubai) 106.0 FM - Abu Dhabi Media
Ibiza Global Radio 95.3 FM - Dance/House/deephouse/electronic - Ibiza Global Network S.L.
Channel 4 FM - Top 40; 104.8 FM - Channel 4 Radio Network
RAK Rock Radio 90.7 - The First Rock Radio station in UAE. - RAK Rock Radio
Capital Radio UAE - Old 60s, 70s, 80s
Dubai Eye 103.8 - News, Talk & Sport; 103.8 FM - Arab Media Group
Pulse 95 Radio 95.0 - Acoustic, Talk, Tech - Sharjah's first English radio station. Sharjah Broadcasting Authority
Classic FM 91.6 - Classic, Jazz and Chill Out - Abu Dhabi Media.
Radio Classical Opera Dubai 88.6 - The First Classical and Opera Radio station in UAE
Dubai Da Beat - Internet radio - Hip Hop/R&B/Afrobeats - Internet Radio Media Panama

Japanese radio
Fuji FM 88.9  - Arab Media Group
Nippon Dubai 102.9 FM (日本ドバイ) - Arab Media Group
Kawaii Emirates Radio (カワイイエミレーツラジオ) - Kawaii Radio Group

Spanish radio
Ibiza Global Radio 95.3 - Dance/House/deephouse/electronic; 95.3 FM (Dubai) - Ibiza Global Network S.L.
El Monstro de Radio 92.9 FM - Arab Media Group
Emiratos Radio de Clàsico 106.4 FM - Arab Media Group

African radio
African FM 93.6 - Arab Media Group (Dubai/Abu Dhabi/Sharjah)

Hindi/Urdu radio
 Kadak 88.8 FM - Dubai, Sharjah - 97.3 FM - Abu Dhabi - 95.6 FM - Al Ain : https://www.adradio.ae/Radio-kadak
 Radio 4 - 89.1 FM No 1 for Hit Gaane - Channel 4 Media Networks 
 City 101.6 - Arabian Radio Network
 TALK 100.3 FM - Fun Asia Network & UAQ Broadcasting Network 
 102.4 Suno FM - is now Radio Mirchi 102.4 in UAE with new radio presenters. http://mirchi.ae
 106.2 BIG FM  - Fun Asia Network & UAQ Broadcasting Network
 105.4 - Vibe FM -

Chinese radio
Dubai Dragon (迪拜龍) (Digital station) - Arabian Radio Network

Malayalam Radio
Live Channels
 FM 94.7 - Radio Asia-First Malayalam Radio Station in Gulf
 FM 96.7 - Hit 96.7 - Arabian Radio Network
 FM 99.6 - Club FM - Mathrubhumi Group
 FM 101.3 - Gold FM - Channel 4 Radio Network
 AM 810 - Pravasi Bharathi[not working now]
 AM 1476 - Radio Asia 
Closed channels
 AM 657  - Asianet Radio (closed since February 2019)
 FM 96.2 - Radio Mango (closed since January 2019)
 FM 100.3 - RadioMe (closed since 2016)
 AM 1152 - Voice of Kerala (closed since early 2018)
 Flowers FM, which previously operated in the frequency of 94.7 MHz, stopped airing in  July 2019. This frequency, run by Dolphin Recording Studio, was taken up by Radio Asia which now operates in this frequency.

Korean radio
K-Pop Dubai 101.8 FM (케이팝 두바이) - Arabian Radio Network

French radio
RadioCity 96.3

Russian radio
 Russian Emirates Radio - Digital station
Radio Optimist - Best Russian internet radio in UAE

Italian radio
Radio La Musica 90.3 FM - Arabian Radio Network (Dubai/Abu Dhabi)

Thai radio
Thai Pop Dubai (ไทยป๊อปดูไบ) (Digital station) - The First Thai pop music radio in Dubai

Tamil Radio
 Tamil
89.4 Tamil FM - Aaren World Media & Advertising LLC
 

 Radio Gilli
106.5 FM UAE - UAQ Broadcasting Network

Vietnamese radio
 Dubai Saigon FM 98.2 (Digital station) - Arab Media Group

Dutch radio
 Tulips FM 91.9 (Digital station) - Arab Media Group (Dubai/Abu Dhabi)

Filipino radio
 Tag 91.1 - Arabian Radio Network
 Wow 107- Hello FM Group

German radio
Glückliche Musik Dubai 106.7 FM - Arabian Radio Network

Persian radio
Radio Shoma 93.4 - Arabian Radio Network

All FM stations

See also
Dubai
Dubai Media City
Physique TV
Dubai 33
Dubai Media Incorporated
Dubai TV
Dubai One
Arab Media Group

References

Mass media in Dubai